Luzia Maria Bezerra (born 23 May 1968) is an Angolan handball player.

She competed at the 1996 Summer Olympics, where Angola placed 7th.

References

External links
 

1968 births
Living people
Angolan female handball players
Olympic handball players of Angola
Handball players at the 1996 Summer Olympics